Wilbert Charles Johnson (born 18 April 1965) is an English actor, who has had notable television roles in Waking the Dead and Babyfather, and on stage in Othello. He played Dom Andrews in Emmerdale from 2012 to 2014.

Early life 
Johnson was born in Muswell Hill, London, and raised in Tottenham. His mother invested in stocks and his father worked for UPS. Johnson had no interest in music while he was in primary school, but after he filled in a role for an absent drummer, he changed his mind.
He went to  Mountview Drama School in Crouch End, London. He also joined another drama group at the Haringey Theatre. He also went to a dance group and learned ballet, contemporary dancing, and break dancing, which he performed for about seven years. He also attended National Youth Theatre for three years.

Career 
Johnson's first professional acting role came in the play Four Seasons at the 1985 Edinburgh Festival Fringe. For the rest of the 1980s he made minor appearances in television series such as Casualty and London's Burning, before playing detective Stevie Johnson in the London Weekend Television series Anna Lee. From 1994 to 1995 he played the supporting role of Detective Constable Michael Skelton in Cracker. Between roles, Johnson worked for a local undertakers, driving the hearse and acting as a pallbearer.

In 2000, he appeared in the BBC One television pilot Waking the Dead, as Detective Sergeant Spencer Jordan, a member of a specialised police unit tasked with investigating "cold cases". Waking the Dead returned for a complete series in 2001, and Johnson was a main cast member until the series ended in 2011. From 2000 to 2002, he appeared as Steve Robinson in Paul Abbott's popular drama series Clocking Off. From 2001 to 2002, he appeared as a main cast member in two series of the BBC's Babyfather.

In 2004, Johnson played the title character in the Royal Lyceum Theatre Company's Othello.

He also played Marcus Kirby in the BBC One school-based drama Waterloo Road. He departed in the second half of the series.

In 2010, he appeared in In a Better World (film) as 'Dr. Najeeb'.

He also performed in a play, called The Swallowing Dark at the Liverpool Playhouse and Theatre503. In 2011, he also starred as gangster boss Big Mike in Anuvahood and in 2008 as Big Man in Adulthood

In November 2011, Johnson appeared as 'Sean Dolan' a Consultant paediatrician in BBC One's Holby City.

In 2012, it was announced that Johnson would be joining Emmerdale as single father Dominic "Dom" Andrews in the later part of the year. On 23 February 2014, it was announced that he would be leaving the show later that year following the death of his character's daughter, Gemma (Tendai Rinomhota).

In 2013, he appeared as a gangster in a film thriller called Life Outside. He also was a special guest DJ at a 'MonologueSlam' event (actors showcase) at 'The Green Carnation' cocktail lounge, Soho.

In 2013, he also co-produced with Christian Ashaiku a film called Disorientated Generation (about a Nigerian man living in London). The film was partially funded by Enfield Council, with a small grant from UK Film Council. The film was originally shot in 2006.

In 2016, Johnson was cast as the Earl of Kent in the Talawa Theatre Company and Royal Exchange Manchester co-production of King Lear. Johnson received praise for his performance, with The Guardian writing "giving depth to straight simplicity" and the Manchester Theatre Awards saying that "... wrongest servant Kent is played with passion and often with humour by Wil Johnson".  

In 2016, Johnson received the British Urban Film Festival honorary award from fellow actor Charles Venn for 30+ years outstanding contribution to film and television.

He is an advocate of colour-blind casting in British television:

Personal life 
Johnson has six children. His eldest daughter is composer, singer, songwriter and cellist Ayanna Witter-Johnson.

Johnson married his wife Camilla in 2014.

Filmography

Television

References

External links 

1965 births
English male film actors
English male stage actors
English male soap opera actors
Black British male actors
Living people
Male actors from London
People from Muswell Hill
National Youth Theatre members
20th-century English male actors
21st-century English male actors